Newcastle Breakers Football Club, an association football club based in Birmingham Gardens, Newcastle was founded in 1991. They became the third Newcastle member admitted into the National Soccer League in 1991 and dissolved in 2000. All players who have played in at least one match are listed below.

Andy Roberts held the record for the greatest number of appearances for Newcastle Breakers. The Australian defender played 169 times for the club. The club's goalscoring record was held by Warren Spink who scored 28 goals.

Key
 The list is ordered first by date of debut, and then if necessary in alphabetical order.
 Appearances as a substitute are included.

Players

References
General
 
 

Specific

Newcastle Breakers FC players
Newcastle Breakers
Association football player non-biographical articles